Kumar Bhaskar Varma Sanskrit and Ancient Studies University (established 2011) is a state government university in Nalbari, Assam, India for studies in Sanskrit language and history of Kamarupa besides other general studies including art, humanities and professional courses.

Etymology
The name of the university is derived from king Bhaskar Varman of ancient Kamrup.

Courses
The university provides courses on Tantric and Shakti cult, Buddhist philosophy, nature/environment worship, Gandhian studies, etc. 

KBVSASU offers undergraduate, postgraduate, and doctoral programs in Sanskrit, Ancient Indian Studies, Philosophy, and other related subjects. 

The university's academic programs are designed to provide students with a comprehensive understanding of Sanskrit and Ancient Indian knowledge, as well as their relevance in contemporary society.

See also
Gauhati University

External links
 Official Website

References

Sanskrit universities in India
Universities in Assam
Education in Nalbari district
2011 establishments in Assam
Nalbari
State universities in India
Educational institutions established in 2011